Tomato chutney is a type of chutney, native to the Indian subcontinent, prepared using tomatoes as the primary ingredient. The tomatoes can be diced, mashed or pulped, and additional typical ingredients used include ginger, chilli, sugar, salt, aam papad, raisin, dates and spices and additionally onion, garlic and peanut or dal for the south Indian version. It can be prepared using ripe red tomatoes or green tomatoes. It can be eaten fresh after preparation, stored in a refrigerator, and can be bottled or canned and stored for later use. Homemade tomato chutney that is canned can have an improved flavor, due to the ingredients intermingling while the product is stored.

Uses
Tomato chutney can be used to accompany myriad foods and dishes, such as kebabs, sandwiches, burgers and meat dishes.

Commercial varieties
Tomato chutney has been a mass-produced product in the United States. Gordon & Dilworth in New York produced it in the 1890s–1900s (decade), and exported some of the product.

Gallery

See also

 List of chutneys
 List of tomato dishes
 Pickled fruit
 Tomato compote
 Tomato jam

References

External links
 Tomato Kasundi. BBC Good Food.

Tomato dishes
Chutney
Nepalese cuisine